Ness is a unisex given name, which means "from the headland".

People
 Ness Edwards (1897–1968), Welsh Labour Party politician
 Ness Flowers, Welsh rugby player in the 1970s and '80s
 Ness Murby (born 1985), Canadian athlete
 Ness Wadia (born 1970), Indian businessman
 Ness Zamir (born 1990), Israeli footballer

Fictional characters
 Ness, the protagonist of EarthBound, the second installment in the Mother series. However, this is likely unrelated to the Scottish name, as Ness is an anagram for SNES, the console EarthBound was released on.